Tina Ehn (born 1960) is a Swedish Green Party politician. She has been a member of the Riksdag since 2006.

External links
Tina Ehn at the Riksdag website

Living people
1960 births
Women members of the Riksdag
21st-century Swedish women politicians
Date of birth missing (living people)
Members of the Riksdag from the Green Party
Place of birth missing (living people)